The Chico Basin Ranch is a working cattle ranch thirty minutes southeast of Colorado Springs, Colorado. The Chico Basin is owned by the Colorado State Land Board, and managed by Ranchlands, a family based ranch management company.  The cattle raised on the ranch are grass fed and no hormones added.  Working cowboys tend to the cattle primarily using quarter horses born and trained on the ranch.  The Chico Basin now has a horse sanctuary for old or injured horses,and is also a wildlife preserve. The Chico Basin works with the Rocky Mountain Bird Observatory to band migratory birds. This activity is also open to schools and universities to come and learn about birds.  Free programs are offered to all ages of children and adults to learn about wildlife and ranch life.

History
The Chico Basin Ranch is owned by the Colorado State Land Board. The Colorado State Land Board was founded in 1876 to manage land given by the federal government to the state and creates revenue for some of the state’s foundations and public education. The Chico Basin Ranch is overseen by the part of the Colorado State Land Board that leases out agricultural farm land. Cattle first grazed on Chico Basin lands in the mid-1800s. Cattleman Charles Goodnight grazed many of his cattle on the present day Chico Basin Ranch. The HOP Ranch, formed by William Holmes and two Detroit business partners at the north end of Chico Basin Ranch, started operations in 1871. Over the next hundred years the ranch land changed hands several times, eventually coming under the jurisdiction of the Pueblo Army Depot. The Chico is currently managed by Duke and Janet Phillips who stress the point of land conservation. The Colorado State Land Board bought the 87,000 acres of land and in 1999 made a lease with the Phillips family. The Phillips are able to lease the land for twenty-five years.

Cows
The Chico Basin’s grass-fed beef is sold through Lasater Grassland Beef, which sells grass-fed beef from both the Chico Basin and the Lasater Ranch. The cattle are raised with no exposure to antibodies, pesticides, or hormones nor are they fed animal bi-products. The beef is kept fresh by dry-aging for about two weeks and then by flash freezing. This is an older way to preserve meat.

Horses
The quarter horses used to herd cows on the Chico Basin Ranch are raised and trained on the ranch. The twenty-five horses that are ridden by guests are trained to be ridden with a western saddle and to accommodate all riding experiences. Riding lessons are offered to inexperienced beginning riders. Guests who are experienced are able to round up cows and participate in the branding of the calves.

Ranchlands Horse Sanctuary
The Chico Basin Ranch has just recently opened a horse sanctuary where horses who need to retire or who are injured can live out the rest of their days on the open range. The horses are not immediately released out on the range. They are gradually acclimated to large pastures. The horses are continually monitored to make sure they are safe and healthy.  All supplemental feed, hoof trimming, and medical treatments are taken care of.   The goal of the horse sanctuary is to give the retired horses a home in their natural habitat.

Accommodations
The housing facility is a renovated adobe house. The house offers two bedrooms, one bathroom, a full kitchen, dining room, and sitting area. There are also washers and dryers available for guest use. Guests may also use wireless internet and a telephone. There is a fire pit and screen porch outside.

Fishing and Hunting
The fishing and hunting on the Chico Basin is coordinated by a branch of Ranchlands LLC, Box T Cowboys. Hunts range from released upland game birds to big game opportunities. Big game hunting includes mule deer. Waterfowl hunting is also available to hunters. Fishing is described by local guides as the best warm water fisheries on Colorado’s Front Range. There are five lakes that contain bass, crappie, and blue gill. Hunts are currently available à la carte. The Box T Cowboys are partners with The Colorado Division of Wildlife, Ducks Unlimited, and other local wildlife organizations.

Bird Watching
The Chico Basin Ranch is a bird banding station for the Rocky Mountain Bird Observatory. Bird banding helps biologists understand migratory habits and bird anatomy. Mist nets are used to catch birds without harming them. Once caught, a small metal band is placed on the bird’s leg. Each band is numbered so when a bird is recaptured scientists will know when and where it was banded. The bird’s condition is observed by checking its weight and measurements. Banding stations are also very important for education. Teachers are encouraged to bring their class to learn about birds and their habitat.  There are over three hundred birds on the ranch bird list. Anyone may come throughout the year and observe the local or the migratory birds.

Education
Free programs are offered for children of ages and college students. Activities incorporate different subjects like science, math, and geography. Aquatic invertebrates, grasslands ecology, botany, livestock grazing, ranch animal anatomy and physiology, natural art, prairie dog studies, and pioneer studies are just a handful of topics that are offered. Activities can be tailored to meet the needs of the class. 
Teaching Environmental Science-Naturally is a program sponsored by the Colorado Division of Wildlife. The Division of Wildlife describes it as an activity the focuses on local natural resources that provide teachers with hands-on experiences, in their own backyard. The program gives students a chance to learn in a classroom and then experience in the outdoors.  Some of the camps that are offered are On the Wing which is a summer camp for bird observatory, Scouting which is for boy and girl scouts, and Ranch Camp which teaches about life on a working cattle ranch. 
For adults, the Chico Basin has a class in holistic resource management, grazing planning, horsemanship and ranch roping. All of these classes are taught by experienced staff educators.

Chico Basin Holistic Goal
The main goal of the Chico Basin Ranch is to have a natural environment that encourages a local economy and conveys a beautiful landscape of wide open spaces. To also live a full meaningful life that has freedom, peacefulness, and privacy. Agriculture should both be creative and traditional. The Chico Basin wants to create an ecosystem that supports human community and wildlife. The Chico Basin staff has the knowledge to teach others about the land and the people living on it.

Partnerships
The Nature Conservancy
Rocky Mountain Bird Observation
American Birding Association
Colorado State Department of Agriculture
Pikes Peak Birding Trail
The Quivera Coalition
The Allan Savory Center for Holistic Management
Lasater Grasslands Beef
Sustainable Beef Productions
Cattle Industry of the American West
Colorado Historical Society
Colorado Adventure Guide
Colorado Film Resources
American Cowboy

Recommendations
The World Outdoors
Ranchweb
American Roundup
Gordon’s Guide
Hidden Trails
Working Cattle Ranches

References

External links
 Chico Basin Ranch - official site

Ranches in Colorado
Buildings and structures in Colorado Springs, Colorado
Education in Colorado Springs, Colorado
Tourist attractions in Colorado Springs, Colorado